István Kovács (24 October 1911 – 23 December 2011) was a Hungarian Communist politician who served in the Political Committee of the Hungarian Working People's Party (MDP) and as a member of the Presidential Council of the People's Republic of Hungary which functioned as collective head of state in Hungary from 1949 to 1989.

He was born in Ditró (now Ditrău, Romania).

References 

1911 births
2011 deaths
People from Harghita County
People from the Kingdom of Hungary
Hungarian Communist Party politicians
Members of the Hungarian Working People's Party
Members of the Hungarian Socialist Workers' Party
Members of the National Assembly of Hungary (1945–1947)
Members of the National Assembly of Hungary (1947–1949)
Members of the National Assembly of Hungary (1949–1953)
Members of the National Assembly of Hungary (1953–1958)
Hungarian centenarians
Men centenarians